Jonel is a given name, a variant of the given name John. Notable people with the name include:

Jonel Perlea (1900–1970), Romanian conductor
Jonel Scott (born 1992), American basketball player

See also
Joner
Jones (surname)